O-phospho-L-serine—tRNA ligase (O-phosphoseryl-tRNA ligase, non-canonical O-phosphoseryl-tRNA synthetase, SepRS) is an enzyme with systematic name O-phospho-L-serine:tRNACys ligase (AMP-forming). This enzyme catalyses the following chemical reaction:

 ATP + O-phospho-L-serine + tRNACys  AMP + diphosphate + O-phospho-L-seryl-tRNACys

In organisms like Archaeoglobus fulgidus, this enzyme ligates O-phosphoserine to tRNACys.

References

External links 
 

EC 6.1.1